Mahsati was a medieval Persian female poet who was reportedly one of the first poets to compose ruba'iyat (quatrains) in her native language.

Name 
Various interpretations of her name have been suggested based on the consonants mhsty, such as Mahisti, Mahsiti or Mihisti. The most accurate interpretation is likely Mahsati, seemingly a combination of māh (moon) and the early Indian loanword satī (virtuous lady).

Biography 
The historicity of Mahsati is problematic to determine. The modern historian Francois de Blois considers her to be a semi-legendary figure, adding that "we have no information whatsoever about the historical person who (apparently) lurks behind the legend." She seemingly lived between the early 11th and the middle of the 12th-century. She may have been born in Ganja, but later authors also consider to have been from Nishapur, Badakhshan or Khujand. She was reportedly one of the first composers of ruba'iyat (quatrains) in Persian.

Mahsati was quickly presented as the heroine of romantic tales, the earliest one being the Ilahi-nama of the Sufi poet Attar of Nishapur (died 1221). The tale narrates that Mahsati was a singer at the court of the Seljuk ruler Ahmad Sanjar. An akin story is reported in the late 13th-century by Abd Allah Jawhari in his commentary of qasida-yi hawliyya, a poem about alchemy. Nevertheless, it was not taken from Attar's Ilahi-nama. According to later authors such as Hamdallah Mustawfi (died after 1339/40), Mahsati served at the court of the Ghaznavid ruler Mahmud of Ghazni. The Iranologist Jan Rypka, however, considered it unlikely that she was already alive during the reign of Mahmud. He adds that Mahmud is evidently confused with Mahmud II, a governor of Sanjar. 

The 15th-century biographical dictionary Tazkirat al-shu'ara of Dawlatshah Samarqandi (died 1495/1507) corroborates Mahsati's link with Sanjar. She and Jahan Malek Khatun are the only female poets mentioned in the book, both being briefly described. There Mahsati is listed amongst Sanjar's panegyric poets, in addition to other figures such as Adib Sabir, Rashid Vatvat, ‘Abd al-Vasih Jabali, and Anvari. Dawlatshah narrates that Mahsati gained the attention and favour of Sanjar by performing a speech which she had improvised. This took place during one evening, when Sanjar left his audience hall to mount his horse, but found the covered by unexpected snow. The speech was the following;

The term dabīr/dabīra (professional scribe) is often associated with her name, but it is uncertain if she ever held this function. Most sources present her as a singer and a musician, as well as a poet of a court.

Work, legacy and assessment 

The vast majority of poems ascribed to her are ruba'iyat (quatrains), whose themes are generally about complaint of a lovers absence, a lovers lack of attention, or a lovers cruelty. Many of these poems are part of the shahrashub (erotic) genre, where the beloved is a young craftsman. Mahsati has become well-known for her bawdy verses. A copy of the Lughat-i Furs of Asadi Tusi (died 1073) stored in the Vatican Library attributes one verse to Mahsati, but other copies consider Rudaki (died 940/41) to have been its author. The Iranologist Edward Granville Browne considered her to some extent have lesbian inclinations.

By this period, Mahsati was acknowledged as the first and most prominent female poet of the Persian language. Valeh was seemingly contemplative of her poems, and saw her not just as a woman, but as an important poet. He recounts the tale of Mahsati, who "was a prostitute and the beloved of Sultan Sanjar." The latter admired her physical attractiveness, but was even more enthusiastic about her poetic ability, as demonstrated in the following excerpt from Valeh;

References

Sources

Further reading 
 
 

Year of birth unknown
Year of death unknown
12th-century Persian-language poets
12th-century women writers
Iranian women writers
Persian-language women poets
Romantic poets
12th-century deaths
12th-century Iranian people
Poets from the Seljuk Empire